The 2007 XM Satellite Radio Indy 300 was the opening round of the 2007 IndyCar Series season. It took place on March 24, 2007 at the Homestead-Miami Speedway in Homestead, Florida, United States.

Results

References

XM Satellite Radio Indy 300
Homestead–Miami Indy 300
XM Satellite Radio Indy 300
XM Satellite Radio Indy 300